Saltiseiidae is a family of mites in the order Mesostigmata.

Species
Saltiseiidae contains one genus, with one recognized species:

 Genus Saltiseius Walter, 2000
 Saltiseius hunteri Walter, 2000

References

Mesostigmata
Acari families